The  is a Japanese flag that consists of a red disc and sixteen red rays emanating from the disc. Like the Japanese national flag, the Rising Sun Flag symbolizes the sun.

The flag was originally used by feudal warlords in Japan during the Edo period (1603–1868 CE). On May 15, 1870, as a policy of the Meiji government, it was adopted as the war flag of the Imperial Japanese Army, and on October 7, 1889, it was adopted as the naval ensign of the Imperial Japanese Navy.

At present, the flag is flown by the Japan Maritime Self-Defense Force, and an eight-ray version is flown by the Japan Self-Defense Forces and the Japan Ground Self-Defense Force. The rising sun design is also seen in numerous scenes in daily life in Japan, such as in fishermen's banners hoisted to signify large catches of fish, flags to celebrate childbirth, and in flags for seasonal festivities.

The flag is controversial in Korea and China, where it is associated with Japanese militarism and imperialism.

History and design 

The flag of Japan and the symbolism of the rising Sun has held symbolic meaning in Japan since the Asuka period (538–710 CE). The Japanese archipelago is east of the Asian mainland, and is thus where the Sun "rises". In 607 CE, an official correspondence that began with "from the Emperor of the rising sun" was sent to Chinese Emperor Yang of Sui. Japan is often referred to as "the land of the rising sun". In the 12th century work The Tale of the Heike, it was written that different samurai carried drawings of the Sun on their fans.

The character  means "sun" or "day";  means "base" or "origin". The compound therefore means "origin of the sun" and is the source of the popular Western epithet "Land of the Rising Sun". The red disc symbolizes the Sun and the red lines are light rays shining from the rising sun.

The design of the Rising Sun Flag (Asahi) has been widely used since ancient times, and a part of it was called  and used as the samurai's crest. The flag was especially used by samurai in the Kyushu region. Examples include the "twelve sun-rays" of the Ryūzōji clan (1186–1607 CE) in Hizen Province and the Kusano clan in Chikugo Province, and the "eight sun-rays" of the Kikuchi clan (1070–1554 CE) in Higo Province. There is a theory that in many parts of the Kyushu region, Hizen and Higo are related to what was called "the country of Japan".There have been many types of Asahi flags since ancient times, and the design in which light rays spread in all directions without clouds expresses honored day or auspicious events, and was a design that was used for celebrate a good catch, childbirth and seasonal festivities. A well-known variant of the flag of the sun disc design is the sun disc with 16 red rays in a Siemens star formation. The  has been used as a traditional national symbol of Japan since at least the Edo period (1603 CE). It is featured in artwork such as  prints, one example being the Lucky Gods' visit to Enoshima  print by Utagawa Yoshiiku in 1869 and the One Hundred Views of Osaka, Three Great Bridges print by Utagawa Kunikazu in 1854. It was re-adopted on June 30, 1954, and is now used by the Japan Maritime Self-Defense Force (JMSDF). The Japan Self-Defense Forces (JSDF) and Japan Ground Self-Defense Force (JGSDF) use a variation of the Rising Sun Flag with red, white and gold colors.

The design is similar to the flag of Japan, which has a red circle in the center signifying the Sun. The difference compared to the flag of Japan is that the Rising Sun Flag has extra sun rays (16 for the ensign) exemplifying the name of Japan as "The Land of the Rising Sun". The Imperial Japanese Army first adopted the Rising Sun Flag in 1870. The Imperial Japanese Army and the Imperial Japanese Navy both had a version of the flag; the naval ensign was off-set, with the red sun closer to the lanyard side, while the army's version (which was part of the regimental colors) was centered. The flags were used until Japan's surrender in World War II during August 1945. After the establishment of the Japan Self-Defense Forces in 1954, the off-set Rising Sun Flag was re-adopted for the JMSDF and a new 8-rays Rising Sun Flag with a yellow border for the JGSDF and JSDF was approved by the Supreme Commander for the Allied Powers (SCAP/GHQ). The flag with the off-set sun and 16 rays is the ensign of the Maritime Self-Defense Force, but it was modified with a different color red. The old flag is darker red (RGB #b12d3d) and the post-WW2 modified version is brighter red (RGB #bd0029).

The Imperial Japanese Army flag with symmetrical 16 rays and a 2:3 ratio was abolished. The Japan Self-Defense Forces and the Ground Self-Defense Force use a significantly different Rising Sun Flag with 8-rays and an 8:9 ratio. The edges of the rays are asymmetrical since they form angles 19, 21, 26 and 24 degrees. It also has indentations for the yellow (golden) irregular triangles along borders. The JSDF Rising Sun Flag was adopted by a law/order/decree published in the Official Gazette of June 30, 1954.

Regardless of the military flag, before the Meiji period, the design of Asahi was used for prayers, festivals, celebration events, reconstruction, logos of companies and products, big catch flags, corporate and product logos and sports.

Present-day use 

Commercially the Rising Sun Flag is used on many products, designs, clothing, posters, beer cans (Asahi Breweries), newspapers, bands, manga, comics, anime, movies, video games (such as E. Honda's stage of Street Fighter II, although this was removed in the 2021 re-release), as well as appearing elsewhere. The Rising Sun Flag appears on commercial product labels, such as on the cans of one variety of Asahi Breweries lager beer. Among fishermen, the  represents their hope for a good catch of fish. Today it is used as a decorative flag on vessels as well as for festivals and events. The Rising Sun Flag is also used at sporting events by the supporters of Japanese teams and individual athletes.

Since June 30, 1954, the Rising Sun Flag has been the war flag and naval ensign of the Japan Maritime Self-Defense Force (JMSDF). JSDF Chief of Staff Katsutoshi Kawano said the Rising Sun Flag is the Maritime Self-Defense Force sailors' "pride". The Japan Self-Defense Forces (JSDF) and the Japan Ground Self-Defense Force (JGSDF) use the Rising Sun Flag with eight red rays extending outward, called . A gold border partially lines the edge.

The flag is also used by non-Japanese, for example, in the emblems of some U.S. military units based in Japan, and by the American blues rock band Hot Tuna, on the cover of its album Live in Japan. It is used as an emblem of the United States Fleet Activities Sasebo, as a patch of the Strike Fighter Squadron 94, a mural at Misawa Air Base, the former insignia of Strike Fighter Squadron 192 and Joint Helmet Mounted Cueing System with patches of the 14th Fighter Squadron. Some extreme right-wing groups display it at political protests.

Controversy 
While Japan considers the rising sun flag part of its history, many people in Korea, China, and other Asian countries say the flag is associated with Japan's wartime atrocities, and is comparable to the Nazi swastika. The Japanese imperial navy used the flag in the early 20th century as Japan colonized the Korean Peninsula, and invaded and occupied parts of China and other Asian countries until its defeat in World War II in 1945.

South Korean campaigns against the Rising Sun Flag began in earnest in 2011. In an association football match against Japan, South Korean footballer Ki Sung-yueng was accused of making a racist gesture, sparking outrage in Japan. Ki responded that he had intended to highlight the racism he had experienced at Celtic F.C. and that his "heart shed tears" after he saw the Rising Sun Flag at the match. On the other hand, many in Japan insist that the Rising Sun Flag was not in the stadium. For this reason, there is a widespread view in Japan that Ki Sung-yueng used the excuse of having seen the Rising Sun Flag to justify his racist gesture.

The flag is banned by FIFA, and Japan was sanctioned by the Asian Football Confederation (AFC) after Japanese fans flew it at an AFC Champions League game in 2017.

In 2012, South Koreans who disapproved of the flag began to refer to it as a "war crime flag". According to political scientist Kan Kimura, in 2012, following Ki Sung-yueng's remarks, Koreans living in New York formed a political group "The Citizens Against War Criminal Symbolism" and started a campaign to equate the Rising Sun Flag with the Nazi swastika and ban it. The following year at the 2013 EAFF East Asian Cup, a banner with a slogan about historical issues with Japan appeared on the Korean cheering squad. As these events were often reported in the Korean media, an international political movement among Koreans to equate the Rising Sun Flag with that of the Nazi swastika and to prohibit it intensified.

According to Koichi Nakano, professor of political science at Sophia University, "no-one in Japan uses the rising sun flag for any purpose other than romanticizing and rewriting the horrible human rights abuses committed under the Japanese empire." He suggests that the American Confederate flag, where it was used in the American civil war by southern states that wanted to keep slavery, would be a better comparison than the Flag of Nazi Germany. The Confederate flag is not banned but is a symbol of racial segregation and perceived superiority, according to critics.

South Korea did not object to Japan's adoption of the Rising Sun Flag for the Japan Maritime Self-Defense Force in 1952, nor to the entry into South Korean ports Japanese warships flying the flag on a warship at the 1998 and 2008 navy fleet reviews held in South Korea. However, when hosting an international fleet review at Jeju Island from October 10 to 14, 2018, South Korea requested all participating countries to display only their national flags and the South Korean flag on their vessels, a request apparently aimed at preventing Japan from flying the Rising Sun Flag, which had been the ensign of the Japanese Maritime Self-Defense Force since it was established in 1954. Japan announced on October 5, 2018 that it would be withdrawing from the fleet review because it could not accept Seoul's request to remove the Rising Sun Flag. Japanese officials say the flag is mandatory for Japan’s naval ships under domestic laws and is widely recognized as identification for the Japanese military under an international maritime convention. On October 6, 2018, JSDF Chief of Staff Katsutoshi Kawano said the Rising Sun Flag was the "pride" of Maritime Self-Defense Force sailors, and that the JMSDF would absolutely not go if they had to remove the flag.

The South Korean parliamentary committee for sports asked the organizers of the 2020 Summer Olympics in Tokyo to ban the Rising Sun Flag, with South Korean lawmaker An Min-suk stating that the Olympics could not proceed peacefully with the flag in the stadium. In September 2019, the Chinese Civil Association for Claiming Compensation from Japan sent a letter to the International Olympic Committee (IOC) to ban the flag.  According to the Associated Press, the IOC confirmed the receipt of the letter and said in a statement "sports stadiums should be free of any political demonstration. When concerns arise at games time we look at them on a case by case basis." In 2021, South Korea's Olympic committee said that in exchange for taking down banners at the Olympic village that referred to the Imjin War, which was ruled by the  IOC as provocative, the IOC promised that the rising sun flag will be banned at stadiums and other Olympic venues. At the end of the Tokyo 2020 Olympics, a delegate from South Korea said that there were no diplomatic incidents between South Korea and Japan during the Olympics, adding that "it was an 'achievement of sports diplomacy' for South Korea that IOC had decided to ban Japan's Rising Sun flag." In response, the Tokyo Organising Committee of the Olympic Games announced on 9 August, "The announcement by the South Korean Olympic Committee is not true. When we contacted the IOC, we confirmed that the IOC will continue to respond to the issue on a case-by-case basis and will not impose a blanket ban. On the morning of 9 August, the IOC had sent a letter to South Korea indicating that the use of the flag will be determined on a case-by-case basis."

Alexis Dudden, a professor of history at the University of Connecticut, argued that the rising sun flag should be banned at the 2020 Summer Olympics because the flag "is part of a collective effort to cleanse the history of imperial Japan’s aggression during the second world war," therefore causing intentional harm to those who suffered under Japanese rule. She added that it was unsurprising that the South Korean government was the first to raise objections to the flag being waved at the 2020 Olympics, since Korea was occupied by Japan from 1910 until 1945.

In 2021, Capcom removed the appearances of the Rising Sun Flag from their re-release of Street Fighter II. Capcom did not provide an official reason for the flag's removal, but it is guessed that the flag was removed in an effort not to offend any parts of the international gaming community.

The Japanese government's basic position on the Rising Sun Flag is that "claims that the flag is an expression of political assertions or a symbol of militarism are absolutely false." The , a right-wing Japanese newspaper, criticized South Korea's attitude toward the Rising Sun Flag, stating that even the United States, who had opposed Japan during World War II, had not protested formally against the Rising Sun Flag.

The Japanese Vexillological Association states that the flag was designed for the Japanese army in the early Meiji period, with a different version adopted by naval forces, stating that "Flags used by the military are domestic decisions", arguing that "the Rising Sun flag existed before Japan went to war and the nature of the issue is different from that of the swastika flag, which was created to symbolize the Nazi regime's political ideologies." Former Prime Minister Shigeru Yoshida has stated that "There is no country in the world that does not know this flag. The flag can be recognized as Japan's in any sea", with the flag having been adopted for its "recognizability" as the naval flag of the JMSDF.

Examples of the Rising Sun Flag design in use

Art

Products

Sports

Japan Self-Defense Forces

United States military

Other

See also 

 Imperial Seal of Japan
 List of Japanese flags
 List of Japanese municipal flags

Notes

References

External links 
 
 "Rising Sun Flag", MOFA, Japan, 27 July 2021.　
 MOFA, Japan (6 September 2021), "Rising Sun Flag as Japanese Longstanding Culture", YouTube.

Flag controversies
Flags of Japan
Military of the Empire of Japan
National symbols of Japan
Naval ensigns